The Paymaster is an American play. It was featured on Broadway in 1888 and starred Maude Adams.

American plays
1888 plays
Broadway plays